Lloyd P. Gerson (Dec. 23, 1948, Chicago, Illinois) is an American-Canadian scholar of ancient philosophy, the history of philosophy, metaphysics, and Neoplatonism. He is a fellow of the Royal Society of Canada. He is best-known for his work on Plotinus, particularly his full-length translation of the Enneads that is based primarily on the Henry-Schwyzer editio minor (HS2) Greek text.

Works 
 Plotinus, London: Routledge, 1994, (Arguments of the Philosophers Series) 
 Knowing Persons. A Study in Plato, Oxford: Oxford University Press, 2004 
 Aristotle and Other Platonists, Ithaca: Cornell University Press, 2005
 Ancient Epistemology, Cambridge: Cambridge University Press, 2009
 From Plato to Platonism, Ithaca: Cornell University Press, 2013
 The Enneads, Cambridge University Press, 2018 (translated and edited with George Boys-Stones, John M. Dillon, R.A. King, Andrew Smith and James Wilberding)
 Platonism and Naturalism. The Possibility of Philosophy, Cornell University Press, 2020

References 

Living people
Fellows of the Royal Society of Canada
American historians of philosophy
Canadian historians of philosophy
1948 births
Academics from Chicago
Translators from Greek